David, Dave or Davey Johnson may refer to:

Academics
David Alan Johnson (born 1952), American philosopher
David E. Johnson (born 1946), American linguist
David H. Johnson (1912–1996) American zoologist 
David K. Johnson, American historian
David Kyle Johnson, professor of philosophy 
David Orme-Johnson (born 1941), professor of psychology at Maharishi University of Management in Fairfield, Iowa
David S. Johnson (1945–2016), American computer scientist
David W. Johnson (scholar) (born 1940), American professor of educational psychology
David Bancroft Johnson (1856–1928), founder and president of Winthrop University
SS David B. Johnson, a Liberty ship 
David Johnson (nephrologist), Australian kidney specialist

Arts and music
C. David Johnson (born 1955), Canadian actor
Dave Johnson (comics), American comic book artist
Dave Johnson (record producer), American music producer sometimes known as "Stiff" Johnson
David C. Johnson (1940), American composer, flutist, and performer of live-electronic music
David Earle Johnson (died 1998), American jazz percussionist, composer, and producer
David Johnson, real name of World Famous Bushman, American street performer in San Francisco, California
David Johnson (American artist) (1827–1908), American painter
David Johnson (photographer) (born 1926), American photographer
David Johnson (Scottish composer) (1942–2009), Scottish composer
David Leslie Johnson, American screenwriter of cinema and television
David N. Johnson (1922–1987), American composer, organist, and professor
David Johnson (dancer)
David Johnson, host of the Economy Watch web series

Broadcasters
Dave Johnson (announcer), American sportscaster known for his horse racing announcing
Dave Johnson (sportscaster), radio sportscaster and play-by-play voice of D.C. United (MLS) and Washington Wizards (NBA)

Business and law
David Johnson (company director) (1932–2016), Australian-born CEO of Campbell Soup
David Johnson (Michigan jurist) (1809–1886), American jurist and legislator
David G. Johnson (born 1956), lawyer and producer
David R. Johnson, lawyer specializing in computer communications

Diplomacy and politics
David Johnson (Canadian politician) (born 1945), Canadian politician
David Johnson (governor) (1782–1855), American politician, governor of South Carolina, 1846–1848
David Johnson (Iowa politician) (born 1950), American politician, Iowa State Senator
David Johnson (Ohio politician), member of the Ohio House of Representatives from 1975 to 1976 and 1979 to 1994
David Johnson (South Dakota politician), member of the South Dakota Senate 2021-present, member of the South Dakota House of Representatives from 2017 to 2021
David Moffat Johnson, Canadian ambassador to Ireland in 1949
David T. Johnson, American diplomat
David W. Johnson (politician), member of the 111th Ohio General Assembly in 1975
David Johnson (Arkansas politician), American politician in Arkansas

Sports

American football
David Johnson (quarterback) (born 1986), American college football quarterback
David Johnson (tight end) (born 1987), American football tight end for the Pittsburgh Steelers
David Johnson (running back) (born 1991), American football player

Association football
David Johnson (footballer, born 1951) (1951–2022), English international footballer (Ipswich/Liverpool)
David Johnson (footballer, born 1970), English footballer
David Johnson (footballer, born 1976), Jamaican footballer
David Johnson (soccer) (born 1984), American soccer player

Baseball
Davey Johnson (born 1943), Major League Baseball player, 1965–1978, and manager
Dave Johnson (1970s pitcher) (born 1948), Major League Baseball pitcher, 1974–1978
Dave Johnson (1980s–1990s pitcher) (born 1959), Major League Baseball pitcher, 1987–1993
Dave "Slim" Johnson, American Negro league baseball player of the 1910s

Track and field
David Johnson (Canadian runner) (1902–1973), Canadian athlete (distance runner) in the 1924 Olympics
David Johnson (triple jumper) (born 1953), English triple jumper
David Johnson (sprinter) (born 1931), Australian sprinter
Dave Johnson (decathlete) (born 1963), American decathlete and 1992 Olympic bronze medalist

Water sports
David Johnson (swimmer) (born 1947), American freestyle swimmer at the 1968 Summer Olympics
Dave Johnson (swim coach) (born 1951), head coach of Swimming Canada from 1993 to 2004
David Johnson (rower) (born 1960), Canadian who competed in rowing at the 1984 Summer Olympics

Other sports
David Johnson (Australian rules footballer) (born 1981), Australian-rules footballer
David Johnson (cricketer, born 1944), English cricketer
David Johnson (cricketer, born 1971), Indian cricketer for India and Karnataka state
David Johnson (basketball) (born 2001), American basketball player
Dave Johnson (basketball) (born 1970), American former basketball player
David Johnson (racehorse owner) (1940s–2013), owner of 2008 Grand National winner Comply or Die
David Johnson (sport shooter) (born 1964), American Olympic shooter
David Johnson (tennis) (born 1969), Australian Paralympian in wheelchair tennis

Other fields
Dave Johnson, contestant on Survivor: The Amazon (2003)
David Dewayne Johnson (1963–2000), American criminal, executed for murder in Arkansas
David Elliot Johnson (1933–1995), Episcopal bishop in the US, Bishop of Massachusetts
David Johnson (born c. 1947), American convict, one of the San Quentin Six
David Johnson, editor of Johnson's Russia List, an email newsletter containing Russia-related news and analysis

See also
David Johnston (disambiguation)